John Kesteven (8 July 1849 – date of death unknown) was an English cricketer.  Kesteven was a right-handed batsman who bowled right-arm roundarm medium pace.  He was born at Sutton-in-Ashfield, Nottinghamshire.

Kesteven made three first-class appearances for Nottinghamshire in 1876, Yorkshire at Trent Bridge, Middlesex at Prince's Cricket Ground, Chelsea, and Lancashire at Old Trafford.  In his three first-class appearances, he scored a total of 24 runs at an average of 6.00, with a high score of 12.

He later became the secretary of the Sutton-in-Ashfield Professional Cricketers' Society.

References

External links
John Kesteven at ESPNcricinfo
John Kesteven at CricketArchive

1849 births
Year of death unknown
Cricketers from Sutton-in-Ashfield
English cricketers
Nottinghamshire cricketers